The fourth season of the TV Land original sitcom Hot in Cleveland premiered on November 28, 2012 and concluded September 4, 2013. It consisted of 24 episodes, split into 12-episode winter and summer segments. The series stars Valerie Bertinelli, Wendie Malick, Jane Leeves, and Betty White.

Plot 
Picking up from where the last season's cliffhanger left off, the baby left on the girls' doorstep turns out to be Wilbur, Owen's son from a one-night stand. Although Owen seemingly decides to put him up for adoption as he doesn't know how to raise him, it's a decision neither he nor the girls are happy with, and Elka's new boyfriend Pierre calls them out on it. Joy then offers to help Owen raise his son if he relocates permanently to Cleveland, which he agrees to. This storyline spawns several more season-long storylines; while Victoria babysits Wilbur and takes him to a baby audition, she manages to land a leading part in a movie directed by Woody Allen. After having somehow misplaced the baby on the way back, the girls go back to the movie studio retrieve him. Whilst there, Melanie reprimands a spiteful actress and talks about the perks of living in Cleveland, which gets her noticed by PR director Chloe, who gives her a job at a PR firm. Things soon get complicated when Melanie finds out that her new boss, Alec, who she ends up falling in love with, is Chloe's ex-husband, and Melanie finds herself trying to control her feelings for Alec as Chloe is still in love with and wants to get back together with him even though he is dating someone else and is preparing to go on vacation with his new girlfriend. To cope, Melanie invents a lie involving a fake boyfriend, actor Emmett Lawson. However, after the encounter with Emmett in person, Alec overhears Melanie's reaction and realizes that she lied and has feelings for him, which Melanie doesn't realize he did until he's gone and Victoria points it out. After several attempts to clarify herself to Alec while he is on vacation, Melanie is surprised when Alec returns and admits that he has feelings for her, though he insists that Chloe shouldn't know yet. However, he accidentally blurts it out while Melanie is trying to save Chloe from falling off the ledge of the workplace building. Chloe accepts the relationship and leaves the firm, and Melanie and Alec begin to form a stable relationship. Eventually, Melanie begins to wonder where their relationship is going when Alec keeps returning her toothbrush that she left at his apartment. After much discussion, they decide to move in together, and Melanie moves out of the house into Alec's apartment.

Speaking of Emmett, who is Victoria's co-star in her movie, although she is suspicious of his motives, the two develop chemistry between each other, especially when rumors circulate of a secret relationship between them. Although they initially play along with the false rumors, this relationship quickly becomes real as the two fall in love with each other. The relationship is cemented near the end of filming, when Emmett invites Victoria on a romantic trip to Morocco with him after filming concludes. On the night of their departure, Emmett plans to propose to Victoria. However, just as he does so, police officers arrest him for tax fraud, which Emmett's business manager had committed under shady deals for which Emmett blindly signed contracts which implicated him as well. Victoria nevertheless accepts his proposal, and hires a wedding planner for their wedding in prison. However, she struggles to cope with the fact that Emmett is in jail and does not know how long he will be there. On the day of her bachelorette party, she suffers an accident and takes it as a sign she needs to figure out what went wrong in her previous marriages before she marries Emmett. After condescending advice from most of her exes, the one ex who truly broke her heart tells her that she puts emotional walls up around the people she loves most and makes them feel like they are not needed when they need to be. Realizing that he is right and fearing she will do this to Emmett, Victoria decides to break off her engagement to him, but Melanie and Joy stop her from doing so, noting that she is already open and happy with him. After Victoria realizes she needs Emmett, she decides to stay with him.

Realizing she wants to set a good example for her grandson, Joy decides to enrol at college, taking up a course in economics. However she quickly feels left out of place due to her age, especially upon learning that Elka goes to the same college and is one of the popular kids, though Elka hesitantly helps her feel more welcome at the college. A storyline running in parallel with this is the fact that Elka and her friend Mamie-Sue are running a shady venture together. Although Joy is suspicious of this when she sees the cash Elka has been hiding, she doesn't find out more information until she takes an internship at a private investigation firm run by Detective Bob Moore. They both spy on Elka where she hands out pills to a crowd of strangers for cash, and then Joy confronts Elka on seeing the stash of drugs in the oven, where Elka confesses that she and Mamie are running an illegal drug business. Although Joy contemplates turning in Elka to the police, she ultimately decides to help Elka and Mamie quickly sell off all of their unsold drug stock (including the large inventory in the basement), with the help of Victoria and Melanie. Their efforts occur as part of the show's first live episode, where they successfully manage to do so as well as avoid trouble with a former drug lord and a major mob boss.

Also, when Joy's mother Philippa is visiting Cleveland for Wilbur's christening, Joy asks Owen to lie about his entire life to appease her mother. When both begin to slip on the lie, a huge argument breaks out during the christening, when Philippa reveals that the man who got Joy pregnant was planning to propose but that she made him leave instead, believing he wasn't right for Joy. Whilst Joy is initially furious with Philippa because of the revelation, she eventually agrees that what her mother did was for the best, and that it wouldn't have worked out anyway. When Joy celebrates Wilbur's birthday, this causes Melanie and Alec to think about the idea of having kids together. Although Alec is eager to raise kids, Melanie is concerned that she is too old for motherhood and they decide to shelve the idea. However, Melanie later decides to break up with Alec to give him a chance at fatherhood, and she quits her job and moves out of his apartment and back into the house with the girls.

On their wedding day, due to the new prison warden's budget and security constraints, Victoria and Emmett marry in a small prison cell ceremony, with an ordained minister, though on their wedding night in a private prison trailer, Emmett reveals that more charges have been filed against him that could see him incarcerated for up to ten years. Meanwhile, the minister, a man working at press magazine who Victoria arranged to secretly photograph the wedding, turns out to be Simon, the man who left Joy while she was pregnant with Owen. Though Joy is angry with him for abandoning her, Simon expresses regret over this and reconciles with Joy, vowing to return soon to be there for her and their family. The season ends on a double cliffhanger as Victoria wakes up to find Emmett gone and Melanie is stunned to find out that she is pregnant.

Cast

Main
 Betty White as Elka Ostrovsky
 Valerie Bertinelli as Melanie Moretti
 Jane Leeves as Rejoyla "Joy" Scroggs
 Wendie Malick as Victoria Chase

Recurring
 Georgia Engel as Mamie Sue Johnson
 Jay Harrington as Alec
 Michael McMillian as Owen
 Alan Dale as Emmet
 Eddie Cibrian as Sean
 Dave Foley as Bob

Special guest stars
 Regis Philbin as Pierre
 Heather Locklear as Chloe
 Pat Harrington Jr. as Mr. Sherden
 Fred Willard as Doctor Hill
 Juliet Mills as Philipa Scroggs
 Ed Begley Jr. as Yogi
 Carter Oosterhouse as himself
 William Shatner as Sally
 Shirley Jones as Sophie
 Carol Burnett as Penny Chase
 Jean Smart as Bess Chase
 Tim Conway as Nick
 Tom Arnold as Danny
 Jack Wagner as Dr. Aaron Everett
 Kirstie Alley as herself
 Mary Tyler Moore as Diane
 Valerie Harper as Angie
 Cloris Leachman as Peg
 George Hamilton as Robin
 Jesse Tyler Ferguson as Wes
 Craig Ferguson as Simon

Guest stars
 Lauren Lapkus as Oscar
 Kelly Schumann as Sally
 Alan Ruck as Reverend Lare
 Nic Bishop as Liam
 Heather Dubrow as Nikki
 Marshall Manesh as Ye'arj
 Robbie Amell as Lloyd
 Cameron Mathison as Bill
 Kevin Farley as Ranger Murphy
 Danny Pudi as Tommy
 Brian Baumgartner as Claude
 John Colella as Rusty
 Jill Benjamin as Brenda
 Sam Daly as Milo
 Carole Gutierrez as Dr. Hernandez
 Samantha Martin as Jenna
 Jim Meskimen as Professor Zucker
 Michael Urie as Jeffrey
 Alice Amter as Dr. Kapoor
 Pej Vahdat as Ravi
 Parvesh Cheena as Manu
 Chris Williams as Dr. Greenly
 Yeardley Smith as Margaret
 Enrico Colantoni as Julian
 Brody Hutzler as Andy
 Edward Kerr as Rex
 Echo Kellum as Johnny
 Nick Searcy as Warden Burkhalter

Production 
Hot in Cleveland was renewed for a 24-episode fourth season on January 12, 2012. The summer premiere on June 19, 2013 aired live at 10:00 PM EDT/9:00 PM CDT (live-to-tape in the Mountain and Pacific time zones).

Heather Locklear, Jay Harrington, and Alan Dale all had recurring roles in season four. Locklear joined in the role of Chloe Summerlin, a former Miss Ohio who hires Melanie to work at her PR firm. Harrington plays as Alec, Summerlin's ex-husband who also works at the PR firm, and Dale plays Emmett Lawson, Victoria's movie co-star and love interest. Regis Philbin, Georgia Engel, and Michael McMillian also reprise their roles in season four. Engel is reunited with Fred Willard, her former TV husband on Everybody Loves Raymond, in the season's fifth episode. Eddie Cibrian guest stars in season four as a fireman and Joy's love interest. Juliet Mills reprises her season 1 role as Joy's hyper-critical mother, Philipa.

Danny Pudi, William Shatner, Brian Baumgartner, and Shirley Jones all have roles in the special live episode ("It's Alive") that kicks off the second half of the season.  Carol Burnett and Tim Conway guest star this season, with Conway returning as Elka's ex-boyfriend Nick, and Burnett playing Penny, Victoria's mother. Jean Smart appears on the same episode as Burnett, as Victoria's sister, Bess. Mary Tyler Moore, Valerie Harper, and Cloris Leachman appear in an episode about Elka and Mamie reuniting with members of their 1963 championship bowling team. The three actresses reunite with White and Engel, with whom they all starred on The Mary Tyler Moore Show. Moore plays a different character than the one she portrayed in the season 2 premiere episode. The same episode features Jesse Tyler Ferguson as a famous avant-garde film director. Craig Ferguson appears in the season finale as Owen's father, who ran out on a 15-year-old Joy after getting her pregnant.

Release
Season four was released in Region 1 on December 3, 2013. The DVD includes all 24 episodes on 3 discs.

Episodes

References 

General references 
 
 
 

2012 American television seasons
2013 American television seasons
Hot in Cleveland seasons